FinancialForce.com Inc is a cloud-based applications company headquartered in San Francisco, California, that provides a cloud ERP solution for Force.com, a cloud computing platform from salesforce.com. FinancialForce supplies Accounting, Billing, Professional Services Automation (PSA), Revenue recognition, Human Capital Management (HCM), and Supply Chain Management (SCM) applications.

History
FinancialForce was founded by Jeremy Roche and Debbie Ashton in 2009 with an investment from UNIT4, and salesforce.com. The resulting cloud accounting system was a single-ledger design that enables real-time financial management and is built on salesforce.com's technology platform, Force.com. The company's tag line is 'One platform. One Truth'.

The company started by specializing in accounting and billing solutions that are built on the Force.com platform, therefore making them closely coupled with Salesforce CRM applications. In December 2010, FinancialForce purchased Appirio's Professional Services Enterprise (PSE) product, which later was renamed  FinancialForce Professional Services Automation.

In November 2013, during FinancialForce's annual customer day, the company announced the acquisitions of Supply Chain Management vendor Less Software and Human Capital Management vendor Vana Workforce and their intention to round out the back office applications portfolio.

In February 2014, the company unveils FinancialForce ERP. Built on the Salesforce Platform, FinancialForce ERP connects customers, employees, partners and products into a single system.

In April 2014, FinancialForce received US$50 million in funding from Advent International.

In March 2015, the company receives $110M in funding from Technology Crossover Ventures and Salesforce Ventures.

In January 2017, FinancialForce appointed former Salesforce and Heroku executive Tod Nielsen as CEO and President.

Locations

FinancialForce's offices are located in:

San Francisco, California (headquarters)
Harrogate, England (EMEA headquarters)
Sydney, Australia (ANZ headquarters)
London, England
Granada, Spain
New York, NY
Chicago, IL
Portland, OR
Seattle, WA

Mobile support
FinancialForce supports mobile usage through FinancialForce Mobile, along with the Force.com mobile application platform, supporting iPhone and iPad as well as BlackBerry and Android. In November 2013, the company introduced FinancialForce 360° Back Office mobile app on the Salesforce1 App Exchange.

Events

Community Live 
Community Live is an annual conference for customers and media on business strategy and product announcements.

Awards and recognition
THINKstrategies, Inc., the leading strategic consulting company focused on the business implications of the on-demand services market, awarded FinancialForce.com the Best of SaaS Showplace (BoSS) Award.

FinancialForce was named in the 2011 Red Herring (magazine) Top 100 North America, a group of 100 companies judged by the publication to be the most innovative across North America. The company has since been listed in the 2011 Red Herring Global Top 100 which identifies the 100 most innovative companies worldwide.

FinancialForce's accounting product (FinancialForce Accounting) was named Software Product of the Year at the 2013 Business Finance Awards. The Business Finance Awards 2013 are designed to recognise excellence in business finance.

AlwaysOn Networks named FinancialForce.com a 2013 OnDemand 100 winner. FinancialForce.com was selected by the AlwaysOn editorial team and industry experts spanning the globe based on a set of five criteria: innovation, market potential, commercialization, stakeholder value, and media buzz.

FinancialForce and CEO Jeremy Roche were chosen by Forbes as the Best Cloud Computing Companies And CEOs To Work For In 2014.

FinancialForce was named in the eighth annual Glassdoor Employees’ Choice Award for the Best Places to Work in 2016 in the U.S. SMB category 

In January 2020, FinancialForce was named to DiversityJobs Award as Top Software & Technology Employers 2020.

References

External links 
 

Accounting software
Companies based in San Francisco
American companies established in 2009
Software companies established in 2009
Cloud computing providers
Customer relationship management software companies
ERP software companies
Financial software companies
Project management software
2009 establishments in California
Privately held companies based in California
Software companies based in the San Francisco Bay Area
Software companies of the United States